Ahmedbeyli (known as Ali Bayramly until 1999) is a village and municipality in the Samukh Rayon of Azerbaijan. It has a population of 1,521.

References

Populated places in Samukh District